The Ten Thousand Year Gorge is a canyon in Gukeng Township, Yunlin County, Taiwan.

History
The gorge was formed by the continuous erosion of stream to the bedrocks.

Geology
The canyon has various geological variations and stream erosion. The stream that passes the gorge starts from Tongxin Waterfall on the upstream upstream and plunges over series of small waterfalls before plummeting over a much larger Dragon Phoenix Waterfall at its downstream. Half way lies a large 10-meter deep Treasure Island Pool.

See also
 Geography of Taiwan

References

Canyons and gorges of Asia
Landforms of Yunlin County